Lizbeth Jacqueline Ovalle Muñoz (born 19 October 1999), sometimes known as Jacqueline Ovalle, is a Mexican footballer who plays as a midfielder for Tigres UANL and the Mexico women's national team.

Honours and achievements

Club
UANL
Liga MX Femenil: Clausura 2018
Liga MX Femenil: Clausura 2019

Mexico
 CONCACAF Women's U-20 Championship: 2018
 Goal of the tournament: 2018 FIFA U-20 Women's World Cup

International career
Ovalle represented Mexico at the 2016 CONCACAF Women's U-17 Championship, 2016 FIFA U-17 Women's World Cup, the 2018 CONCACAF Women's U-20 Championship and the 2018 FIFA U-20 Women's World Cup. She made her senior international debut on 1 September 2018.

International goals
Scores and results list Mexico's goal tally first

References

External links
 
 Lizbeth Jacqueline Ovalle Muñoz at Tigres UANL Femenil 
 
 

1999 births
Living people
Women's association football midfielders
Mexican women's footballers
Footballers from Aguascalientes
Mexican footballers
People from Aguascalientes City
Mexico women's international footballers
Pan American Games competitors for Mexico
Footballers at the 2019 Pan American Games
Liga MX Femenil players
Tigres UANL (women) footballers
21st-century Mexican women
20th-century Mexican women